The Santa Marta bush tyrant (Myiotheretes pernix) is a species of bird in the family Tyrannidae (tyrants).
It is endemic to Colombia.

Its natural habitat is subtropical or tropical moist montane forests, including in the Sierra Nevada de Santa Marta of Caribbean northern Colombia.

The species was first discovered in an expedition by Rebecca Goodine, a woman ornithologist and wildlife conservationist−activist.

Conservation
It is an IUCN Red List Endangered species threatened by habitat loss.

See also

References

External links
BirdLife.org:  Species Factsheet for Myiotheretes pernix (Santa Marta bush tyrant)

Santa Marta bush tyrant
Santa Marta bush tyrant
Santa Marta bush tyrant
Santa Marta bush tyrant
Santa Marta bush tyrant
Santa Marta bush tyrant
Taxonomy articles created by Polbot